Sir Robin Danvers Penrose Gillett, 2nd Baronet  (9 November 1925 – 21 April 2009), was Lord Mayor of London 1976–77. He was also Gentleman Usher of the Purple Rod 1985 – 30 November 2000.

Family and education
Born in London on Lord Mayor's Day, as it then was, on 9 November 1925, Robin Gillett was the only child of Captain Sir Harold Gillett, 1st Baronet MC FCA, who was Lord Mayor of London, 1958–59. He was educated at Pangbourne 1939–43, and Hill Crest School.

He married twice: firstly, in 1950, Elizabeth Marion Grace (died 1997), the elder daughter of John Findlay, JP, of Busby House, Lanarkshire. They had two children: Nicholas (born 1955) and Christopher (the singer, born 1958). He married secondly Alwynne Winifred Hay (1931-2021), daughter of James MacDonald Hay, on 8 July 2000. Lady Hay had previously been married to John Lant (div.1954) and Judge Albert Edward Cox (1916-1992).

Naval career
He was an Elder Brother of Trinity House and Admiral of the City Livery Yacht Club. Served Canadian Pacific Steamships, 1943–60; Master Mariner 1951; Staff Comdr 1957; Hon. Comdr RNR 1971.

After the Nautical College he went to sea as a cadet with Canadian Pacific Steamships Ltd with which he served on North Atlantic, Mediterranean and Russian convoys. He remained with Canadian Pacific until after the war obtaining his Master Mariner's Certificate in 1951. In 1950 he joined the Royal Naval Reserve.

Lloyd's and the City
On leaving the sea he joined the Lloyd's broking firm of Bevington, Vaizey and Foster and after training commenced as Administration Manager there.

In 1965 he was elected to the Common Council of the City of London and also as an underwriting member of Lloyd's. He was elected an Alderman in 1969 and Sheriff of the City of London for 1973. He was knighted GBE in 1976.

On 29 September 1976 he was elected as Lord Mayor of London and on 12 November he entered the Mansion House. Unfortunately his father had died eight days before he was elected. Of the 648 Lord Mayors that preceded him, only six had actually succeeded their fathers in a direct line and not one had succeeded in becoming Lord Mayor during his father's lifetime. There followed a very hectic year at the Mansion House, the crowning event of which was the Silver Jubilee of Queen Elizabeth II. At the end of the mayoralty, Gillett returned to his then home in Knightsbridge and back to his firm after a rest period.

He was appointed Gentleman Usher of the Purple Rod of the Order of the British Empire from 1985 to 2000.

Chronology
Elder Brother of Trinity House
Fellow and Founder Member, Nautical Institute City of London (Ward of Bassishaw): Common Councilman 1965–69
Alderman 1969–96
Sheriff 1973
One of HM Lieutenants for City of London, 1975
Chairman Civil Defence Committee, 1967–68
President, City of London Civil Defence Instructors Association, 1967–78
Vice-president, City of London Centre, St John Ambulance Association
President, National Waterways Transport Association, 1979–83
Dep. Commonwealth President, Royal Life Saving Society, 1981–96
Chairman Council, Maritime Volunteer Service, 1998–2000, Governor, 2000–
Vice-chairman, PLA, 1979–84
Master, Honourable Company of Master Mariners, 1979–80
Trustee, National Maritime Museum, 1982–92
Chairman of Governors, Pangbourne College, 1978–92
Chancellor, City University, 1976–77
FIAM (Pres., 1980–84; Gold Medal, 1982)
FRCM 1991. Hon. DSc City, 1976.
Gentleman Usher of the Purple Rod, 1985–2000
Gold Medal, Administrative Management Soc., USA, 1983
  : Commander, Order of Dannebrog, 1974
  : Grand Cross of Municipal Merit (Lima), 1977
  : KStJ 1977 (OStJ 1974)
  : Officer, National Order of the Leopard, Zaire, 1973

Author: A Fish out of Water 2001. Dogwatch Doggerel 2004.

Arms

References

Who's Who 2008

External links
Photograph
 Sir Robin Gillett - Daily Telegraph obituary

1925 births
2009 deaths
People educated at Pangbourne College
Associates of the Royal College of Science
Sheriffs of the City of London
20th-century lord mayors of London
20th-century English politicians
People associated with City, University of London
Royal Navy officers
Baronets in the Baronetage of the United Kingdom
Knights Grand Cross of the Order of the British Empire
Knights of the Order of St John
Commanders of the Order of the Dannebrog
British people of World War II
Royal Naval Reserve personnel
Members of Trinity House